The Communist Party of Canada (Ontario) is the Ontario provincial wing of the Communist Party of Canada. Using the name Labor-Progressive Party from 1943 until 1959, the group won two seats in the Legislative Assembly of Ontario:  A.A. MacLeod and J.B. Salsberg were elected in the 1943 provincial election as "Labour" candidates but took their seats as members of the Labor-Progressive Party, which the banned Communist Party launched as its public face in a convention held on August 21 and 22, 1943, shortly after both the August 4 provincial election and the August 7 election of Communist Fred Rose to the House of Commons in a Montreal by-election.

MacLeod and Salsberg served as Members of Provincial Parliament (MPPs) from 1943 until 1951 and 1955 respectively. A third LPP member, Alexander A. Parent, who was also president of UAW Local 195, was elected as the Liberal-Labour MPP for Essex North in 1945. In January 1946, Parent announced he was breaking with the "reactionary" Liberals and sat the remainder of his term in the legislature as a Labour representative while voting with LPP MPPs MacLeod and Salsberg. He did not run for re-election in 1948.

The party has not been able to win any seats at the provincial level since Salsberg's defeat in 1955. The party continued to run under the Labor-Progressive banner up to the 1959 provincial election, after which it again identified itself as the Communist Party.

Individual members of the party have been elected to school boards in the past few decades, but have done so as independents rather than as "Communist Party" candidates. Since 2019, the party has been led by Drew Garvie.

Election results

Source: Elections Ontario Vote Summary

September 6, 2012 provincial by-elections: Kitchener—Waterloo, 87 votes (0.19%), seventh out of ten candidates.

Notes

1Ran under the label "Labour" or "Socialist-Labour"

2In addition, in 1945, the Labor-Progressive Party and Liberal Party of Ontario jointly endorsed 6 Liberal-Labour, 3 of whom were elected, in an effort to marginalize the CCF.

Party leaders
 Leslie Morris, 1945–1948 (1945 election)
 A.A. MacLeod, 1948–1951 (1948 election)
 Stewart Smith, 1951–1957 (1951 election, 1955 election)
 Bruce Magnuson 1957–1970 (1959 election, 1963 election and 1967 election)
 William Stewart 1970–1980 (1971 election, 1975 election and 1977 election)
 Mel Doig (1981 election)
 Gordon Massie (1985 and 1987 elections)
 Elizabeth Rowley (1990 election)
 Darrell Rankin (1995 election)
 Hassan Husseini 1998– 2001 (1999 election)
 Elizabeth Rowley  2001–2016 (2003 election, 2007 election and 2011 election)
 Dave McKee 2016–2019
 Drew Garvie 2019–present

Constituency associations
The party has three constituency associations registered with Elections Ontario:
 Davenport
 Hamilton Centre
 Ottawa Centre

Party financing

Source: Elections Ontario, Yearly Financial Statements, Political Parties, Constituency Associations

See also
List of Ontario general elections
List of Ontario political parties
Communist Party candidates, 2003 Ontario provincial election

References

External links
 Communist Party of Ontario

Ontario
Provincial political parties in Ontario
1940 establishments in Ontario
Political parties established in 1940